Charlie Colkett (born 4 September 1996) is an English professional footballer who plays as a midfielder for Crewe Alexandra.

Club career

Chelsea
In 2007, Colkett joined Chelsea at under-11 level from Charlton Athletic and progressed through the club's academy system. He was part of the Chelsea youth side which recorded back to back triumphs in both the UEFA Youth League and the FA Youth Cup in 2015 and 2016.

On 9 April 2016, Colkett was named upon the first-team substitute bench along with fellow academy players Ola Aina and Kasey Palmer, in Chelsea's 1–0 away defeat to Swansea City. However, he failed to make an appearance. A couple of weeks later, Colkett went onto sign a new three-year deal, with his current contract due to expire in June 2016.

Loan to Bristol Rovers
On 31 August 2016, Colkett joined League One side Bristol Rovers on a season-long loan along with teammate Jake Clarke-Salter. On 10 September 2016, Colkett went onto make his professional debut in a 2–2 draw with Rochdale, replacing Hiram Boateng with ten minutes remaining. He scored his first goal for Bristol Rovers which was also his first professional goal, with a late equaliser in a 1–1 draw with Bradford City. On 1 October 2016, Colkett scored the winner in stoppage time to earn a 3–2 win over Northampton Town. Colkett was recalled by Chelsea on 5 January 2017 ending his loan spell with Bristol Rovers with 17 appearances in all competitions and 3 goals.

Loan to Swindon Town
On 11 January 2017, Colkett joined Swindon Town on loan for the remainder of the 2016–17 campaign. Three days later, Colkett made his Swindon Town debut in their 2–1 victory over Bolton Wanderers, assisting Yaser Kasim's late winner in the 89th minute, before being replaced by Sean Murray with seconds remaining. On 14 March 2017, Colkett scored his first goal for Swindon in their 4–2 home defeat against Sheffield United, netting the hosts opener of the evening from 20-yards out.

Loan to Vitesse
On 6 July 2017, Colkett joined Vitesse on loan for the 2017–18 campaign. On 5 August 2017, Colkett made his Vitesse debut during their Johan Cruyff Shield tie against Feyenoord, replacing Thomas Bruns in the 1–1 draw, which Feyenoord eventually won on penalties. On 31 January 2018, after only appearing eleven times, including two starts all season, Colkett's loan spell was terminated and he returned to Chelsea.

Loan to Shrewsbury Town
On 21 July 2018, Colkett joined League One side Shrewsbury Town on loan for the 2018–19 campaign. He started in the season-opening 1–0 home loss to Bradford City but made only five more appearances – all in cups – before Shrewsbury ended his loan prematurely on New Year's Eve.

Östersunds FK
On 25 January 2019, Colkett signed for Östersund on a 3-year deal for a "small fee". He scored his first Allsvenskan goal from distance in a 3–2 home win over Falkenbergs FF on 7 April. He terminated his contract with Östersund on 1 January 2022.

Cheltenham Town
On 18 January 2022, Colkett joined EFL League One side Cheltenham Town on a deal until the end of the 2021–22 season. On 6 May 2022, Colkett was released by the club after not being offered a further contract.

Crewe Alexandra
In June 2022, Colkett joined League Two side Crewe Alexandra on a free transfer, signing a two-year deal. He made his debut with a substitute appearance in Crewe's second game of the 2022–23 season, a 3–0 win over Harrogate Town at Gresty Road on 6 August 2022. He made his first Crewe start on 9 August 2022, playing in an EFL League Cup first round defeat at Grimsby Town, but suffered a severe hamstring injury sidelining him for at least three months. He made a return in November 2022 and on 1 January 2023 scored his first Crewe goal, the winner in a 1–0 victory over Tranmere Rovers at Gresty Road but limped off after suffered another hamstring injury ruling him out for several weeks.

International career
Colkett has represented England from under-16 level to under-20 level.

Career statistics

Honours
Chelsea Reserves
FA Youth Cup: 2013–14, 2014–15
UEFA Youth League: 2014–15, 2015–16

References

External links

 England profile  at The FA

1996 births
Living people
Footballers from the London Borough of Newham
English footballers
England youth international footballers
Association football midfielders
Chelsea F.C. players
Bristol Rovers F.C. players
Swindon Town F.C. players
SBV Vitesse players
Shrewsbury Town F.C. players
Östersunds FK players
Cheltenham Town F.C. players
Crewe Alexandra F.C. players
Eredivisie players
English Football League players
Allsvenskan players
English expatriate footballers
Expatriate footballers in the Netherlands
Expatriate footballers in Sweden
English expatriate sportspeople in the Netherlands
English expatriate sportspeople in Sweden